Stakes is a 2015 Australian drama film directed by Richard Owen. It follows the journey of a young aspiring thoroughbred trainer to fill the shoes of her recently deceased father, while battling a corrupt establishment, fraught with unethical competitors and submersed in the criminal element of the horse racing industry. The film stars many local actors from the Riverina region. It is the second feature film to be set in the city of Wagga Wagga.

Production
The film was predominantly shot in Wagga Wagga, though some scenes were shot in Albury and Junee. It was filmed over 6–8 months in 2014 and was set to be released in time for the 2014 Melbourne Cup in October, however, it was pushed back to the following year's Melbourne Cup.

Release 
Stakes premiered 29 October 2015 at The Arts Centre Gold Coast and in the city of Wagga Wagga. The film was released simultaneously in cinemas around Australia.

References

External links
 
 

2015 crime drama films
Australian horse racing films
2010s sports drama films
Films about horses
Films set in New South Wales
Australian sports drama films
Australian crime drama films
2010s English-language films
2010s Australian films